Xu Ran (born 10 October 1980) is a Chinese former professional tennis player.

Xu played Davis Cup for China as a doubles specialist, featuring in 11 ties between 2000 and 2004, from which he won a total of five rubbers. He also represented his country at the 2002 Asian Games and reached the quarter-finals of both the men's doubles and mixed doubles.

On the ATP Tour, Xu made two main draw appearances at the Shanghai Open, in 2000 and 2001.

References

External links
 
 
 

1980 births
Living people
Chinese male tennis players
Asian Games competitors for China
Tennis players at the 2002 Asian Games
21st-century Chinese people